The West African mud turtle (Pelusios castaneus), also known as the West African side-necked turtle or swamp terrapin, is a species of turtle in the family Pelomedusidae.
Pelusios castaneus is a freshwater species and is endemic to West and Central Africa.

Taxonomy
 
The so-called Seychelles black terrapin, Seychelles mud turtle, or Seychelles terrapin was considered a species of turtle (Pelusios seychellensis) in the family Pelomedusidae, endemic to Seychelles.

Genetic analysis of the lectotype has shown, however, that this turtle was never a separate species, and is in fact Pelusios castaneus. 
It is possible that specimens were confused in a private collection before being acquired by the Zoological Museum Hamburg in 1901, or else mislabeled there.

Distribution
The West African mud turtle is found in the following countries of West and Central Africa: Angola, Benin, Burkina Faso, Cameroon, Cape Verde, Democratic Republic of the Congo, Republic of the Congo, Equatorial Guinea, Gabon, Ghana, Guinea, Guinea-Bissau, Ivory Coast, Liberia, Mali, Príncipe, Senegal, Sierra Leone, Togo. Additionally, it has been introduced to Guadeloupe.

Ecology
The West African mud turtle is carnivorous and feeds on aquatic prey. There are five phases to feeding; preliminary head fixation on the prey, fine-tuning the head fixation, final approach by the head, grasping of the prey followed by manipulation and transportation, and suction, resulting in ingestion after which the prey is swallowed. The final phase varies according to whether the prey is fast-moving, like a fish, or slow-moving like a gastropod mollusc.

References

Bibliography

External links
 Pelusios castaneus West African mud turtle.

West African mud turtle
Reptiles of West Africa
Reptiles of Angola
Reptiles of Cameroon
Vertebrates of Cape Verde
Reptiles of the Democratic Republic of the Congo
Reptiles of the Republic of the Congo
Reptiles of Equatorial Guinea
Reptiles of Gabon
Fauna of Príncipe
Reptiles of Guadeloupe
Taxa named by August Friedrich Schweigger
West African mud turtle